Lisa Johansen Persheim (born 21 June 1990), is a Norwegian team handball player. She plays for the club Thames Handball Club. She started her playing career at her club Ellingsrud IL in the junior section  and later on participated in the Sparserien league in Norway. In 2014/15 she participated in the Women's EHF Challenge Cup Round 3 where a highly unusual result of identical scores was recorded on both playing dates

References

Norwegian female handball players
1990 births
Living people
21st-century Norwegian women